Frederick Commodore (born 17 August 1975) is a Ghanaian former association football defender who played professionally in the USL A-League and the German 2. Bundesliga.

In 2003, Commodore signed with the Rochester Rhinos of the USL A-League. In 2004, he played for the Montreal Impact. The Impact released him in April 2005 after he suffered a season-ending leg injury.

References

External links
 Frederick Commodore, Ghana Web

Living people
1975 births
Accra Hearts of Oak S.C. players
Alemannia Aachen players
Ghanaian footballers
Ghanaian expatriate footballers
Montreal Impact (1992–2011) players
Rochester New York FC players
VfR Mannheim players
A-League (1995–2004) players
2. Bundesliga players
Expatriate soccer players in Canada
Expatriate soccer players in the United States
Association football midfielders